Mildred Akinyi "Milka" Alango (born 10 March 1989 in Mombasa) is a Kenyan taekwondo practitioner. Alango qualified for the women's 49 kg class at the 2008 Summer Olympics in Beijing, after winning the championship title from the African Qualification Tournament in Tripoli, Libya. She lost the preliminary match to China's Wu Jingyu, who was able to score seven points at the end of the game. Because her opponent advanced further into the final match, Alango took advantage of the repechage round by defeating Sweden's Hanna Zajc on the superiority rule, after the pair had tied 2–2. She progressed to the bronze medal match, but narrowly lost the medal to Venezuela's Dalia Contreras, with a sudden death score of 0–1.

References

External links

NBC 2008 Olympics profile

1989 births
Living people
Kenyan female taekwondo practitioners
Olympic taekwondo practitioners of Kenya
Taekwondo practitioners at the 2008 Summer Olympics
Sportspeople from Mombasa
21st-century Kenyan women